Arūnas Jurkšas (born 3 May 1972) is a Lithuanian athlete. He competed in the men's javelin throw at the 2000 Summer Olympics.

References

1972 births
Living people
Athletes (track and field) at the 2000 Summer Olympics
Lithuanian male javelin throwers
Olympic athletes of Lithuania